François Xavier Yombandje (Koumra; July 9, 1956) is a former Central African Roman Catholic bishop. 

Yombandje was born on July 9, 1956 in Koumra, Chad. He was ordained a priest in 1985. In 1997 he became bishop of Kaga-Bandoro and in 2004 of Bossangoa. He was chairman of the Central African Episcopal Conference. 

Yombandje resigned from his pastoral duties on May 16, 2009 after a Vatican investigation found that many local priests had violated their vows of chastity, poverty and obedience. Yombandje was also specifically cited for having a common-law wife. A few weeks later the archbishop of Bangui, Paulin Pomodimo, resigned as well.

References

External links 
Catholic Hierarchy

1956 births
Living people
20th-century Roman Catholic bishops in the Central African Republic
Chadian Roman Catholic priests
People from Mandoul Region
21st-century Roman Catholic bishops in the Central African Republic
Roman Catholic bishops of Kaga-Bandoro
Roman Catholic bishops of Bossangoa